Yaritayuq (yarita local name for Azorella compacta, Quechua -yuq a suffix, "the one with the yarita", also spelled Yaretayoj) is a mountain in the Andes of Bolivia which reaches a height of approximately . Yaritayuq lies northeast of the village of Quechisla.

References 

Mountains of Potosí Department